Licinini is a tribe of ground beetles in the family Carabidae. There are more than 20 genera and 240 described species in Licinini.

Genera
These 21 genera belong to the tribe Licinini:

 Atrotus Péringuey, 1896
 Badister Clairville, 1806
 Colpostoma Semenov, 1889
 Derostichus Motschulsky, 1860
 Dicaelus Bonelli, 1813
 Dicrochile Guérin-Méneville, 1846
 Dilonchus Andrewes, 1936
 Diplocheila Brullé, 1835
 Eurygnathus Wollaston, 1854
 Eutogeneius Solier, 1849
 Hormacrus Sloane, 1898
 Lacordairia Laporte, 1867
 Lestignathus Erichson, 1842
 Licinus Latreille, 1802
 Microferonia Blackburn, 1890
 Microzargus Sciaky & Facchini, 1997
 Omestes Andrewes, 1933
 Physolaesthus Chaudoir, 1850
 Platylytron W.J.MacLeay, 1873
 Siagonyx W.J.MacLeay, 1871
 Zargus Wollaston, 1854

References

External links

 

Licininae
Articles created by Qbugbot